Kevin Omar Galván López (born 10 March 1996) is a Panamanian professional footballer who currently plays as a leftback for San Miguelito .

International
Galván made his debut for the Panama national football team in a friendly 2-0 loss to Venezuela on 11 September 2018.

References

External links
 
 

1996 births
Living people
Sportspeople from Colón, Panama
Panamanian footballers
Panama international footballers
Association football fullbacks
Sporting San Miguelito players
Liga Panameña de Fútbol players
2015 CONCACAF U-20 Championship players
2019 CONCACAF Gold Cup players